The Kingfisher Post Office, also known as The Old Post Office, is the historic former post office in Kingfisher, Oklahoma.  The post office was built by the Dieter & Wenzil Co. of St. Louis, Missouri; work on the building began on October 1, 1912, and finished on September 1, 1913. The stucco building has a red-tile hipped roof and cornices on each side. The post office operated until a larger post office opened in 1976.

The post office was listed on the National Register of Historic Places in 1978.

References

External links

Buildings and structures in Kingfisher County, Oklahoma
Post office buildings in Oklahoma
Government buildings completed in 1913
Post office buildings on the National Register of Historic Places in Oklahoma
1913 establishments in Oklahoma
National Register of Historic Places in Kingfisher County, Oklahoma